Joey Wong Cho-Yee (AKA Joey Wang, Wang Tsu Hsien, or Joey Ong Jyo Han/Hen) (born 31 January 1967) is a Hong Kong based Taiwanese actress and singer. Along with Maggie Cheung, Rosamund Kwan and Cherie Chung, she is widely regarded as one of the ‘Four Flowers’ of Hong Kong cinema.

Biography
Wong was born on 31 January 1967 and raised in Taipei, where she completed her secondary school. She has an older brother, a younger brother and a sister.
Her father was a basketball player and encouraged her to become a professional basketball player when she was fourteen. Shortly thereafter she shot a TV commercial for sport shoes which drew the attention of a film producer who made her the leading lady of film It'll Be Very Cold by the Lakeside This Year. Her appearance in the film attracted the attention of producer Mona Fong of Shaw Brothers who invited Wong to come to Hong Kong. In 1985, Wong then appeared in the Hong Kong film Let's Make Laugh II, opposite Derek Yee Tung Sing. 

In 1987, she portrayed a beautiful ghost in A Chinese Ghost Story. Her portrayal led to her becoming a film idol in Japan and South Korea.  In the following years, Wong continued to star in a dozen more movies playing similar characters, such as a ghost or a vixen. 

In 1989, she starred in the Japanese TV series A Woman From Hong Kong, later also starring in commercials and publishing photo albums.

In 1992, she made her singing debut with the Japanese and Mandarin CD single, "Hold You In My Arms Forever". In 1993, she appeared as the White Snake in Tsui Hark's Green Snake, a revision of the Madame White Snake legend told from the perspective of the younger Green Snake.

In 1994, Wong expressed a desire to retire from film making, staying away from the limelight until 1997 when she returned to the silver screen in the Japanese movie Peking Genjin (Peking Man) and released the companion CD single "Who Are You?".

In 1998, she released the extended Japanese CD Angelus and her first and only full CD, in Mandarin, Isolation a.k.a. Isolated From The World.

She returned to semi-retirement after the release of Isolation, but returned once again to films in 2001 with Peony Pavilion, then once again announced her retirement in 2002 after leaving Chyi Chin.

In 2004, she appeared in Shanghai Story and reportedly appeared in a Taiwanese TV series with on again, off again beau Chyi Chin. It was reported that she enjoyed her return to films and reportedly signed a multi-film contract. However, the unexpected suicide of her friend and former movie co-star Leslie Cheung caused her to withdraw once again from the limelight.

In September 2005, coinciding with the worldwide release of Shanghai Story, she once again announced her formal retirement. She currently resides in Vancouver, British Columbia, Canada and is studying English.

Joey Wong was also very well known for her relationship with Chyi Chin, a Taiwanese singer. Their relationship lasted about 16 years, from 1987 to 1991 and 1993 to 2002.

Filmography

Film

Television

Discography

Singles

Awards and nominations

References

External links 
 
 baidu post－largest fanclub in china 
 Tianya Joey group－Joey database 

1967 births
Living people
20th-century Taiwanese actresses
21st-century Taiwanese actresses
20th-century Hong Kong actresses
21st-century Hong Kong actresses
Actresses from Taipei
Converts to Buddhism
Expatriate actresses in Canada
Republic of China Buddhists
Hong Kong people of Taiwanese descent
Taiwanese expatriates in Hong Kong
Taiwanese expatriates in Japan
Taiwanese expatriates in Canada
Taiwanese film actresses
Taiwanese television actresses
Hong Kong Buddhists
Taiwanese-born Hong Kong artists
Taiwanese people from Anhui